Al-Afdal ibn Salah ad-Din ("most superior"; c. 1169 – 1225, generally known as Al-Afdal, was one of seventeen sons of Saladin, Sultan of Egypt and Syria, and thus of Kurdish descent. He succeeded his father as the second Ayyubid emir of Damascus. His career as a ruler was chequered and punctuated by repeated armed conflict with other prominent members of his family. He was eventually politically marginalised by his uncle, al-Adil, and given a number of less important towns to rule. He also converted to Shia Islam later on in his life as indicated by 
the poems that he wrote that were quoted by Al-Dhahabi where he said, "Abu Bakr committed oppression against Ali."

Biography

Early life
Al-Afdal was one of the Ayyubid commanders at the Battle of Arsuf, when Saladin was defeated by Richard I of England and the forces of the Third Crusade.  
When Saladin died in 1193, al-Afdal inherited Damascus, but not the rest of his father's territories; Egypt was claimed by his brother al-Aziz, where he was already installed as governor, and Aleppo by another brother az-Zahir. As his father was dying, al Afdal summoned all the emirs then at Damascus to swear allegiance to him. Al-Afdal was in theory the head of the Ayyubid dynasty, but he was not able to exert any level of authority over his siblings, and soon proved that he had little ability as a ruler.

Conflict within the Ayyubid dynasty and ultimate loss of power
In May 1194 al-Afdal was attacked by his brother, al-Aziz, in his capital Damascus. The uncle of both, al-Adil (Saphadin), marched down from the Jezira and brokered a peace. This was broken within a year and al-Aziz again marched on Damascus, but was driven back to Egypt by al-Afdal. By 1196, al-Adil had lost patience with al-Afdal's incompetence and allied himself with al-Aziz. Al-Adil then annexed Damascus, allowing al-Afdal to retire to the town of Salkhad, in the Hauran. In November 1198 al-Aziz died from the effects of falling from a horse while hunting. Fearing the ambition of al-Adil, the emirs of Egypt called al-Afdal from retirement to be regent of Egypt for al-Aziz's young son. In 1199 he allied with his brother az-Zahir of Aleppo, who was also al-Adil's enemy, and they besieged their uncle in Damascus. Al-Adil, skilfully played his nephews off against each other, and suborned the vassals of both from their allegiance. The arrival of al-Khamil, al-Adil's son, at Damascus with reinforcements and continuing quarrels led to the ending of the siege in December 1199. Al-Afdal retreated to Egypt, but his uncle pursued him and defeated his army at Bilbeis. Fleeing to Cairo, al-Afdal sued for peace on any terms he could get from al-Adil; stripped of Egypt, he was promised the cities of Samosata and Mayyafaraqin. On the 17th of February 1200 al-Adil proclaimed himself 'sultan'. Al-Afdal was refused control of Mayyafaraqin by another of al-Adil's sons, al-Auhad. Al-Afdal once again allied with az-Zahir and the brothers once more besieged Damascus. However, dissension again broke out between the brothers, with al-Afdal eventually losing the will to continue fighting. Al-Adil confirmed al-Afdal's rule over Samosata, Saruj and a number of other towns. Az-Zahir admitted his uncle's suzerainty in the Spring of 1202, and al-Adil had succeeded in exerting his authority over all the Ayyubid dominions.

Last attempt at regaining power
In 1218, following the death of az-Zahir, al-Afdal interrupted his seclusion at Samosata to make his last bid for power. He allied himself with Kaykaus I the Seljuk Sultan, with the intention of taking the city of Aleppo. True to form, after taking two towns he soon quarrelled with his ally and took no further part in the fighting, Kaykaus being subsequently defeated. Al Afdal died in 1225.

References

Bibliography
Humphreys, R. S. (1997) From Saladin to the Mongols: The Ayyubids of Damascus, 1193-1260, SUNY Press

Further reading
 
 

1160s births
1225 deaths
12th-century Ayyubid rulers
Muslims of the Third Crusade
Muslims of the Fifth Crusade
Ayyubid emirs of Damascus
12th-century Kurdish people
13th-century Kurdish people
Saladin